Stadium–Chinatown (formerly Stadium) is an elevated station on the Expo Line of Metro Vancouver's SkyTrain rapid transit system. The station is located in Vancouver, British Columbia, Canada, at the eastern entrance of the Dunsmuir Tunnel. It is one of four stations on the Expo Line that serve Downtown Vancouver.

As its name implies, the station is located near both the Stadium District and Chinatown. TransLink's Lost Property Office is located at this station.

History

Opened as "Stadium" in 1985 as part of the original SkyTrain system (now known as the Expo Line), the station was designed by Austrian architecture firm Architektengruppe U-Bahn. The station's original name was based on its proximity to BC Place Stadium. Both the station and the stadium were vital to Vancouver's Expo 86. The "Chinatown" portion of the station's name was added in 2004, because local merchants and politicians wished to promote the historical and cultural significance of Vancouver's Chinatown district, located just one block away from the station.

During the Expo 86 World's Fair, the station served as a transfer point between the main site of the fair and the Canadian Pavilion (now Canada Place), located on Burrard Inlet at Waterfront station. Transferring between these two stations was free for fair attendees during the fair using special shuttle trains, which ran from a third platform at Stadium station (where there was a connection to the monorail serving the main Expo 86 site) to the Canadian Pavilion at Waterfront station. An automated announcement was aired during people's shuttle ride explaining how SkyTrain and its automated driverless technology operated. The third platform and track were taken out of revenue use once Expo 86 ended and are rarely used except in cases of extreme crowds from hockey games and concerts. The third platform and track are primarily used for training purposes, train storage, special event service, and rerouting during rail replacement.

The station was originally constructed with a passageway under Beatty Street to the west in anticipation of future development. When the Amec Building, built across Beatty Street, did not link to the underground passage, the passage was closed and has been occupied by TransLink's Lost Property Office since 1991. The staircase on the west side of Beatty was filled with sand and topped with a concrete sidewalk so that the passage could be reopened in the future.

Until 1988, the Expo Boulevard / Abbott Street entrance was just an open-stair emergency exit. However, with the closing of the entrance tunnel under Beatty Street as well as poor accessibility to Stadium station from False Creek, the emergency exit was redesigned and enclosed, opening in 1989 as the second access point to and from the station. TransLink's Compass Customer Service Centre was located at the station from its inception until September 2022, when it was relocated to Waterfront station.

Services

Important destinations near the station include Rogers Arena and BC Place Stadium, where home games of the Vancouver Canucks, BC Lions, and Vancouver Whitecaps FC are played and other major events are held. Following an event at BC Place or Rogers Arena, the passenger volumes are sufficiently large that it is feasible to post TransLink personnel to collect and check fares at this station, in contrast to the proof-of-payment system that was in force prior to the roll out of the Compass card. The Queen Elizabeth Theatre as well as the downtown location of Vancouver Community College are located a few blocks away from the station.

Chinatown is located northeast of the intersection of Taylor and Keefer. The station entrance closest to Chinatown is labelled with traditional Chinese characters in addition to English. The sign reads: "Stadium–Chinatown Station ". This makes Stadium–Chinatown the only station on the system to be officially labelled in Chinese. The International Village shopping centre (colloquially called "Tinseltown" after the movie theatre on the third floor) and the Chinatown location of T & T Supermarket are located near the station at the intersection of Abbott and Keefer.

Station information

Station layout

Entrances
 The Beatty Street entrance  is a fully accessible entrance at the west end of the platforms, serving BC Place and the downtown area. An elevator connects the upper street, concourse, train, and restricted levels.
 The Keefer Place entrance  is located on the concourse level shared with the Beatty entrance, beside the Lost Property Office. It is the closest entrance serving the Chinatown area.
 The Expo Boulevard entrance is located at the east end of the platforms, serving Rogers Arena. No elevator and escalator access is available from this entrance; however, wheelchair access to the platform can be made using the elevators of a nearby residential development via a circuitous routing. There is no access to platform 3.

Transit connections

 Local and suburban bus stops are located near the intersection of Hamilton Street and Dunsmuir Street, two blocks west from the Beatty Street entrance:
5 Robson
6 Davie
17 Oak
240 Lynn Valley
241 Upper Lonsdale (peak only)
246 Highland
247 Upper Capilano (peak only)
257 Horseshoe Bay (express)
N15 Cambie Night Bus
N24 Lynn Valley Night Bus
 In addition, local community shuttles serving the north False Creek area operate on Expo Boulevard and Abbott Street, on the east side of the station near the Expo Boulevard entrance:
23 Beach
23 Main Street Station

References

Expo Line (SkyTrain) stations
Railway stations in Canada opened in 1985
Buildings and structures in Vancouver
1985 establishments in British Columbia